Beauty school may refer to:

 Any organization that teaches cosmetology
 "Beauty School" (song), a song on the Deftones album Diamond Eyes